Dorothy Richards (1916–2016) was an Australian writer.

Biography
Richards spent most of her life in Williamstown. She completed her primary education from Strathmore Grammar School, which later became Westbourne Grammar School. Later, she attended Methodist Ladies' College, Melbourne. She was married to Harold Richards.

Her interest in writing developed when she joined Friday Writers. During her writing career, she wrote for the Australian Women's Weekly and the Weekly Times. Based on her writing, a movie named My Father Is a Wonderful Man was released.

Books
 An Anthology of Aunts: Growing Up in Williamstown (1998)
 Free Range (2007)

References

1916 births
2016 deaths
20th-century Australian writers